Alkupis (from the Lithuanian 'river of alka') could refer to several Lithuanian toponyms:
 
 Alkupis (village), village in Šilalė District Municipality

Several short rivers, the largest of them:
Alkupis (Nevėžis tributary), the Nevėžis tributary in Kėdainiai District Municipality.